The 2018 German Darts Open was the third of thirteen PDC European Tour events on the 2018 PDC Pro Tour. The tournament took place at Saarlandhalle, Saarbrücken, Germany, between 13–15 April 2018. It featured a field of 48 players and £135,000 in prize money, with £25,000 going to the winner.

Peter Wright was the defending champion after defeating Benito van de Pas 6–5 in the final of the 2017 tournament, but he was knocked out in the second round of the tournament by Germany's Max Hopp.

Hopp went on to win his first PDC senior event, after defeating Michael Smith 8–7 in the final. 

Hopp also became the first Host Nation Qualifier to make the final of an event of the PDC European Tour. It also marks the first time a German player won a PDC tour event. Noticeably, Hopp won both his semi-final and final match with a 121 finish on the bullseye, with his opponents waiting on a two-dart finish.

Prize money
This is how the prize money is divided:

Prize money will count towards the PDC Order of Merit, the ProTour Order of Merit and the European Tour Order of Merit, with one exception: should a seeded player lose in the second round (last 32), their prize money will not count towards any Orders of Merit, although they still receive the full prize money payment.

Qualification and format 
The top 16 entrants from the PDC ProTour Order of Merit on 27 February will automatically qualify for the event and will be seeded in the second round.

The remaining 32 places will go to players from five qualifying events – 18 from the UK Qualifier (held in Barnsley on 9 March), eight from the West/South European Qualifier (held on 12 April), four from the Host Nation Qualifier (held on 12 April), one from the Nordic & Baltic Qualifier (held on 27 January) and one from the East European Qualifier (held on 27 January).

Simon Whitlock withdrew with illness on the day of the tournament, so Daniel Larsson, who was due to face him in round 2, was given a bye to round 3.

The following players will take part in the tournament:

Top 16
  Michael van Gerwen (quarter-finals)
  Peter Wright (second round)
  Rob Cross (semi-finals)
  Michael Smith (runner-up)
  Daryl Gurney (third round)
  Mensur Suljović (third round)
  Joe Cullen (quarter-finals)
  Dave Chisnall (third round)
  Ian White (semi-finals)
  Simon Whitlock (withdrew)
  Gerwyn Price (quarter-finals)
  Mervyn King (quarter-finals)
  Jelle Klaasen (third round)
  Darren Webster (third round)
  Benito van de Pas (third round)
  Steve Beaton (second round)
 

UK Qualifier
  William O'Connor (first round)
  Terry Jenkins (first round)
  Kirk Shepherd (second round)
  Luke Humphries (second round)
  Nathan Aspinall (first round)
  Alan Tabern (third round)
  James Wade (second round)
  Richard North (first round)
  Robert Thornton (first round)
  Paul Nicholson (second round)
  Steve West (second round)
  Keegan Brown (first round)
  Ricky Williams (first round)
  Matthew Edgar (first round)
  Steve Lennon (second round)
  Luke Woodhouse (first round)
  Cameron Menzies (second round)
  Simon Stevenson (first round)

West/South European Qualifier
  Jermaine Wattimena (second round)
  Maik Kuivenhoven (second round)
  Dimitri Van den Bergh (second round)
  Jan Dekker (first round)
  Danny Noppert (second round)
  Jose Justicia (second round)
  Zoran Lerchbacher (first round)
  Ronny Huybrechts (first round)

Host Nation Qualifier
  Max Hopp (winner)
  René Eidams (second round)
  Tobias Müller (first round)
  Dragutin Horvat (first round)

Nordic & Baltic Qualifier
  Daniel Larsson (third round) 

East European Qualifier
  Tytus Kanik (first round)

Draw

References 

2018 PDC European Tour
2018 in German sport
April 2018 sports events in Germany
Sport in Saarbrücken